The Edwards Professor of Egyptian Archaeology and Philology is a university professorial chair held at University College London.

History
The chair was founded on the death of Amelia Edwards of the Egyptian Exploration Fund in 1892, who bequeathing her collection of Egyptian antiquities to University College London, together with a sum of £2,500 to found an Edwards Chair of Egyptology. Her protégé, William Matthew Flinders Petrie, was the first to take the chair.

Incumbents
 1892–1933: Professor Sir William Matthew Flinders Petrie
 1934–1946: Stephen Glanville
 1951–1970: Walter Bryan Emery
 1970–1986: Harry S. Smith
 1988–1993: Geoffrey Thorndike Martin
 1994–2010: John W. Tait 
 Current: Stephen Quirke

External links
 William Petrie
 Amelia Edwards

Egyptian Archaeology and Philology, Edwards
1892 establishments in England
Egyptian Archaeology and Philology, Edwards